George Francis Abbott (June 25, 1887 – January 31, 1995) was an American theatre producer, director, playwright, screenwriter, film director and producer whose career spanned eight decades.

Early years
Abbott was born in Forestville, New York, to George Burwell Abbott (May 1858 Erie County, New York – February 4, 1942 Hamburg, New York) and Hannah May McLaury (1869 – June 20, 1940 Hamburg, New York). He later moved to the city of Salamanca, which twice elected his father mayor. In 1898, his family moved to Cheyenne, Wyoming, where he attended Kearney Military Academy. Within a few years, his family returned to New York, and he graduated from Hamburg High School in 1907.

In 1911 he obtained a Bachelor of Arts degree from the University of Rochester, where he wrote his first play, Perfectly Harmless, for the University Dramatic Club. Abbott then attended Harvard University, to take a course in playwriting from George Pierce Baker. Under Baker's tutelage, he wrote The Head of the Family, which was performed at the Harvard Dramatic Club in 1912. He then worked for a year as 
"author, gofer, and actor" at the Bijou Theatre in Boston, where his play The Man in the Manhole won a contest.

Career

Abbott started acting on Broadway in 1913, debuting in The Misleading Lady. While acting in several plays in New York City, he began to write; his first successful play was The Fall Guy (1925).

Abbott acquired a reputation as an astute "show doctor". He frequently was called upon to supervise changes when a show was having difficulties in tryouts or previews prior to its Broadway opening. His first hit was Broadway, written and directed in partnership with Philip Dunning, whose play Abbott "rejiggered". It opened on September 16, 1926, at the Broadhurst Theatre and ran for 603 performances. Other successes followed, and it was a rare year that did not have an Abbott production on Broadway.

He also worked in Hollywood as a film writer and director  while continuing with his theatre work.

Among those who worked with Abbott early in their careers are Desi Arnaz, Gene Kelly, June Havoc, Betty Comden, Adolph Green, Leonard Bernstein, Jules Styne, Stephen Sondheim, Elaine Stritch, John Kander, Fred Ebb, Carol Burnett and Liza Minnelli. He introduced the "fast-paced, tightly integrated style that influenced" performers and especially directors such as Jerome Robbins, Bob Fosse and Hal Prince.

Autobiography 
In 1963, he published his autobiography, Mister Abbott.

Personal life
Abbott was married to Edna Lewis from 1914 to her death in 1930; they had one child. Actress Mary Sinclair was his second wife. Their marriage lasted from 1946 until their 1951 divorce. He had a long romance with actress Maureen Stapleton from 1968 to 1978. She was 43 and he was 81 when they began their affair, then ten years later Abbott left her for a younger woman. His third wife was Joy Valderrama. They were married from 1983 until his death in 1995.

Abbott was a vigorous man who remained active past his 100th birthday by golfing and dancing. He died of a stroke on January 31, 1995, at his home on Sunset Island off Miami Beach, Florida, at age 107. The New York Times obituary read, "Mrs. Abbott said that a week and a half before his death he was dictating revisions to the second act of Pyjama Game with a revival in mind, in addition to working on a revival of Damn Yankees.

At the age of 106, he walked down the aisle on opening night of the Damn Yankees revival and received a standing ovation. He was heard saying to his companion, 'There must be somebody important here.'" Just thirteen days before his 107th birthday, Abbott made an appearance at the 48th Tony Awards, coming onstage with fellow Damn Yankees alumni Gwen Verdon and Jean Stapleton at the end of the opening number, a medley performed by the nominees for Best Revival of A Musical, which included Grease, She Loves Me, Carousel, and his own Damn Yankees.

He was cremated at Woodlawn Park Cemetery in Miami and the ashes were taken by his wife.

Family

In addition to his wife, who died in 2020 at 88, Abbott was survived by a sister, Isabel Juergens, who died a year later at the age of 102; two granddaughters, Amy Clark Davidson and Susan Clark Hansley; a grandson, George Clark, and six great-grandchildren.

Honours
In 1965, the 54th Street Theatre was rechristened the George Abbott Theatre in his honour. The building was demolished in 1970. New York City's George Abbott Way, the section of West 45th Street northwest of Times Square, is also named after him.

He received New York City's Handel Medallion in 1976, honorary doctorates from the Universities of Rochester and Miami, and the Kennedy Centre Lifetime Achievement Award in 1982. He was also inducted into the Western New York Entertainment Hall of Fame and the American Theatre Hall of Fame. In 1990, he was awarded the National Medal of Arts.

He received the Kennedy Centre Honours in 1982.

Work

Stage
Source: Playbill 

 1915: The Yeomen of the Guard (actor)
 1918: Daddies (actor)
 1920: The Broken Wing (actor)
 1923: Zander the Great (actor)
 1924: Hell-Bent Fer Heaven (actor)
 1925: The Fall Guy (playwright)
 1926: Love 'em and Leave 'em  (playwright, director)
 1926: Chicago (director)
 1926: Broadway (playwright, director)
 1928: Gentlemen of the Press (director)
 1932: Lilly Turner (playwright, director, producer)
 1932: Twentieth Century (director, producer)
 1934: Small Miracle (director)
 1935: Three Men on a Horse (playwright, director)
 1935: Jumbo (director)
 1936: On Your Toes (book)
 1937: Room Service (director, producer)
 1937: Brown Sugar (director, producer)
 1938: The Boys from Syracuse (book, director, producer)
 1939: Too Many Girls (director, producer)
 1940: Pal Joey (director, producer)
 1940: The Unconquered (producer, director)
 1941: Best Foot Forward (producer, director)
 1943: Kiss and Tell (play) (producer, director)
 1944: A Highland Fling (play) (producer, director)
 1944: On the Town (director)
 1945: Billion Dollar Baby  (musical) (director)
 1947: High Button Shoes (director)
 1948: Where's Charley?	(book, director)
 1949: Mrs. Gibbons' Boys (producer, director)
 1950: Call Me Madam (director)
 1951: A Tree Grows in Brooklyn (book, director, producer)
 1953: Wonderful Town (director) Me and Juliet (director)
 1954: The Pajama Game (book, director)
 1955: Damn Yankees (book, director)
 1957: New Girl in Town (book, director)
 1959: Once Upon a Mattress (director)
 1959: Fiorello! (book, director)
 1960: Tenderloin (book, director)
 1961: Take Her, She's Mine (director)
 1962: A Funny Thing Happened on the Way to the Forum (director)
 1962: Never Too Late (director)
 1964: Fade Out – Fade In (director)
 1965: Flora, The Red Menace (book, director)
 1965: Anya (book, director)
 1967: How Now, Dow Jones (director)
 1968: The Education of H*Y*M*A*N K*A*P*L*A*N (director)
 1969: The Fig Leaves Are Falling (director)
 1970: Norman, Is That You? (director)
 1976: Music Is (book, director)
 1987: Broadway (revival, book, director)
 1994: Damn Yankees (revival, book, consultant, script revisions)

Filmography

Awards and nominations
Source: PlaybillAwards

 1955 Tony Award for Best Musical – The Pajama Game 1956 Tony Award for Best Musical – Damn Yankees 1960 Pulitzer Prize for Drama – Fiorello! 1960 Tony Award for Best Direction of a Musical – Fiorello! 1960 Tony Award for Best Musical – Fiorello! 1963 Tony Award for Best Direction of a Musical – A Funny Thing Happened on the Way to the Forum 1976 Special Tony Award: The Lawrence Langer award
 1983 Drama Desk Award for Outstanding Director of a Musical – On Your Toes 1987 Special Tony Award on the occasion of his 100th birthday

Nominations

 1930 Academy Award for Best Achievement in Writing – All Quiet on the Western Front 1958 Writers Guild of America Award for Best Written American Musical – Damn Yankees 1958 Tony Award for Best Musical – New Girl in Town 1958 Writers Guild of America Award for Best Written American Musical – The Pajama Game 1959 Directors Guild of America Award for Outstanding Directorial Achievement in Motion Pictures – Damn Yankees 1963 Tony Award for Best Direction of a Play – Never Too Late 1968 Tony Award for Best Direction of a Musical – How Now, Dow Jones''

See also

 List of centenarians (actors, filmmakers and entertainers)

References

External links
 
 
 
 George Abbot fansite
 George Abbott Biography

1887 births
1995 deaths
20th-century American male actors
20th-century American screenwriters
20th-century American male writers
Male actors from Boston
Male actors from New York City
Male actors from Wyoming
Men centenarians
American autobiographers
American centenarians
American film producers
American male stage actors
American male screenwriters
American male silent film actors
American musical theatre directors
American theatre managers and producers
Donaldson Award winners
Drama Desk Award winners
Film directors from New York City
Kennedy Center honorees
People from Salamanca, New York
People from Forestville, New York
People from Cheyenne, Wyoming
People from Erie County, New York
Pulitzer Prize for Drama winners
Tony Award winners
United States National Medal of Arts recipients
University of Rochester alumni
Writers from Boston
Writers from New York City
Writers from Wyoming
American male non-fiction writers
Film directors from Wyoming
Screenwriters from New York (state)
Screenwriters from Wyoming
Screenwriters from Massachusetts
Special Tony Award recipients
Writers from New York (state)
American dramatists and playwrights